Chernenko, less commonly transliterated Tchernenko, is a surname of Ukrainian origin. Notable persons with the surname include:

 Albert Chernenko (1935–2009), Russian philosopher and son of Konstantin
 Anastasiya Chernenko (born 1990), Ukrainian triathlete
 Anna Chernenko (1913–2010), wife of Konstantin
 Artemi Tchernenko (born 1978), Russian tennis player
 
 Konstantin Chernenko (1911–1985), leader of Soviet Union from 1984 to 1985
 Ruslan Chernenko (born 1992), Ukrainian footballer
 Vladimir Chernenko (born 1981), Uzbekistani rower
 Yevhen Chernenko (1934–2007), Ukrainian archaeologist

See also
 
 Cerna (surname)
 Chernyaev

Ukrainian-language surnames